The flag of the Netherlands Antilles was white, with a horizontal blue stripe in the center, one-third of the flag's hoist, superimposed on a vertical red stripe of the same width, also centered; six white, five-pointed stars are arranged in a hexagon pattern in the center of the blue band, their points up. It was adopted on 19 November 1959.

The six stars represented the six main islands of Aruba, Bonaire, Curaçao, Saba, Sint Eustatius, and Sint Maarten.

1986 modification

In 1986, Aruba seceded from the Netherlands Antilles resulting in the flag being modified to depict only five stars to represent the remaining five islands.

Dissolution of the Netherlands Antilles

On 10 October 2010, the Netherlands Antilles was dissolved into Curaçao, Sint Maarten and the three public bodies of the Caribbean Netherlands.

Flag of the Governor of the Netherlands Antilles

Colors

See also
Flag of the Netherlands
Flag of Aruba
Flag of Bonaire
Flag of Curaçao
Flag of Saba
Flag of Sint Eustatius
Flag of Sint Maarten

References

Flags introduced in 1959
 
National flags
Flag of the Netherlands Antilles
Flag of the Netherlands Antilles
1959 establishments in the Netherlands Antilles